This is a list of qualifying teams for the 2009 NCAA Division I men's basketball tournament. A total of 65 teams entered the tournament. Thirty of the teams earned automatic bids by winning their conference tournaments. The automatic bid of the Ivy League, which did not conduct a postseason tournament, went to its regular season champion. The remaining 34 teams were granted at-large bids, which were extended by the NCAA Selection Committee. All teams were seeded within their assigned region from 1 to 16, which was disclosed, while the Selection Committee seeded the entire field from 1 to 65, which was not disclosed.

Qualifying teams

Automatic bids
Automatic bids to the tournament were granted for winning a conference championship tournament, except for the automatic bid of the Ivy League given to the regular season champion. Seeds listed were seeds within the conference tournaments. Runners-up in bold face were given at-large berths.

Historic notes:
 North Dakota State is the first men's team in Division I or its predecessors to reach the NCAA Tournament in its first year of postseason eligibility since Southwestern Louisiana, now Louisiana-Lafayette, accomplished the feat in 1972.

At-large bids

Listed by region and seeding

Bids by conference

Bids by state

References

NCAA Division I men's basketball tournament qualifying teams
 
qualifying teams